Virú is a town in Northern Peru, capital of the province Virú in the region La Libertad. This town is located 48 km south Trujillo city and is primarily an agricultural center in the Viru Valley.

See also
Virú Valley
Chao
Virú District

References

Populated places in La Libertad Region
Cities in La Libertad Region